Novaković is a Serbian, Montenegrin and Croatian surname, a patronymic derived from the male given name Novak (meaning "the new one"). It is rendered as Novakovič in Slovenian, and historically anglicized as Novakovich. It may refer to:

Aleksandar Novaković, Serbian writer
Bojana Novakovic, Serbian-Australian actress
Borislav Novaković, Serbian politician
Damjan Novaković (born 1966), Slovenian basketball player and coach
Eveline Novakovic, British video game music composer
Igor Novaković, Croatian footballer
Josip Novakovich, Croatian-American writer
Lola Novaković, Serbian singer
Milivoje Novaković, Slovenian footballer
Mitar Novaković, Montenegrin footballer
Nebojša Novaković, Swedish retired footballer
Nenad Novaković, Serbian football goalkeeper
Phebe Novakovic, American businesswoman
Stojanka Novaković Stoja, Serbian pop-folk singer

See also
Novakovich
Novković, surname
Kovic (disambiguation)

Serbian surnames
Croatian surnames